Bryant Sih (born 21 September 1967) is a Taiwanese sailor. He competed in the men's 470 event at the 1996 Summer Olympics.

References

External links
 

1967 births
Living people
Taiwanese male sailors (sport)
Olympic sailors of Taiwan
Sailors at the 1996 Summer Olympics – 470
Sportspeople from Oakland, California